LGS standing for Le Groupe Swing is a Canadian néo-trad band of Franco-Ontarian origins. The band started as Swing before change of name in 2017. The two main members of Swing are Michel Bénac and Jean-Philippe Goulet.

Biography
Contrarily to what the name could seem to suggest, its sound is not inspired by swing music, only Franco-Ontarian folklore, which is adapted with techno music. The name comes from the Quebec French term Swinger meaning, in this context, to dance, and the phrase Swing la bacaisse dans le fond d'la boîte à bois!, a classic, almost cliché expression used in Quebec folk music parties.

Michel Bénac

Singer and musician, Michel Bénac, is a Franco-Ontarian and the main singer for Swing. He was born in Ottawa, Ontario and still lives in the same city. Michel’s mother is Louise, his father is Michel Bénac and he also has a brother named Christian Mathurin and a sister Jocelynne Bénac. Michel Benac Jr. was an excellent and advanced voice student of Cantor Stephen Chaiet of the NATS (National Association of Teachers of Singing of America).

Jean-Philippe Goulet
The other musician and singer for Swing is Jean-Philippe Goulet. He was born in Rimouski, Québec. Goulet, a multi-instrumentalist, played guitar, keyboards and violin with Indiscipline and Pole Volt before joining Swing, in which he plays violin and mandolin, as well as singing. He currently lives in Montreal, Québec. His mother’s name is Jean, his father is André Goulet and he has 2 sisters, Isabelle and Marie-Claude Goulet.

History
An experienced musician that loves to dance to the sound of the violin, Michel Bénac, met an R’n’B singer, Bobby Lalonde, who was coming back from Nashville to rediscover the French language. They joined forces and created a new sound, the urban folk music.  In 1998, the band Swing was created. Michel and Bobby wrote their first single on February 18, 1998: “Ça va brasser”. After 5 years, Bobby, co-founder of the band, left the group. Shortly after, Jean-Philippe Goulet joined Michel Bénac to continue the urban folk music band Swing. Being in the core of the group, Jean-Philippe discovered his folk music roots and brought his rock and roll influences into the music created. With the multiple trips and passionate meetings, the flavour is still prominent.

Music
Swing is composed of a duo, Michel Bénac and Jean-Philippe Goulet. They have travelled across Canada and to many countries abroad to share their sound with the world. As of 2012, Swing has played over 900 shows and in front of at least 500,000 spectators. 
This duo created a sound for all ages. Using their voices and the musical sounds from their violin, mandolin and scratch, Swing had delivered music that incorporates hip/hop and rock but with a touch of traditional music.

In 1999, Swing debuted their first album called: La Chanson S@crée. This unique sound of urban folk became desirable for listeners and was seen distributed across Canada. 
 
On July 1, 2001, on Parliament Hill for Canada’s birthday, Swing played in front of 100,000 spectators, in conjunction with having the show broadcast on live television. This performance gave them a nomination at the Gemini Gala (2002) in the category of Best Performance, and/or Best guest on a program or series. Swing also walked away with 4 Trille-Or Awards from the “Gala de la chanson et de la musique franco-ontarienne”.

In 2003, they released their second album called: La vie comme ça. Bobby Lalonde passed the torch to the French musician/singer Jean-Philippe Goulet.  Swing was invited to participate on many television shows such as Le Garage, Belle et Bum, Palmarès, etc. They also participated in a telethon to help support the research of childhood diseases and disorders. During that year, Swing also started an interprovincial tour and was seen performing at the “Festival franco-ontarien” as well as the Festival acadien de Caraquet.

The following year, in 2004, Swing was asked to record 2 songs for the Québec Carnaval, to be added to their compilation album. Shortly after, Swing went on tour in Eastern Europe, visiting such countries as Poland, Czech Republic, Slovakia, Hungary and Romania. Once they returned to Canada, they performed in Montreal for the Canada’s birthday in front of more than 150,000 spectators. Having more than 75 shows under their belts across the country, the end of the year finished with a nomination at the Gala de l'Association québécoise de l'industrie du disque, du spectacle et de la vidéo (ADISQ) in the category of Best Traditional Album.

In 2005, Swing participated for a second time at the Québec Carnaval and started their international tour in South America. This tour took the band to Colombia, Ecuador and Panama.  Swing also got a breakthrough in France during the Festival Les Déferlantes de Cap-Breton. This year, Swing also won 3 awards at the Gala de la chanson et de la musique franco-ontarienne.

The next year, in 2006, Swing continued their international success, and participated at the Festival de la francophonie in Douai as well as the Festival de la Virée francophone in Cherbourg, both located in France. This is when they started thinking about their 3rd album. 

In 2007, Swing is recognized with 2 more awards and took the year to create their 3rd album entitled: Tradarnac.

In 2008, Swing received a nomination from the Canadian Folk Music Awards in the category of French Album of the Year.

In 2009, Swing received another nomination, this time at the Juno’s for the Best French Album of the Year with Tradarnac.

In 2011, Michel Bénac continued working on Swing as well as working at Lafab Musique Record company, where he produced the albums himself.

During the 2015 Pan American Games in Toronto, Swing performed at the closing ceremony.

Awards
Trille-Or Awards (Gala de la chanson et de la musique Franco-ontarienne)
2001 Best Song
2001 Best Show
2001 Best Producer
2001 Best Revelation of the Year
2005 Best Group
2005 Best Show
2005 Best Music Video
2007 Best Group
2007 Best Show

Discography

Albums
1999: La Chanson S@crée (credited as Swing)
2003: La vie comme ça (credited as Swing)
2007: Tradarnac (credited as Swing)
2015: Swing. (credited as Swing)

EPs
2013: One Thought (credited as Swing)
2014: Le temps s'arrête (credited as Swing)
2018: 45 tours, Vol.1, EP (credited as LGS)
2019: 45 tours, Vol.1, Single (credited as LGS)
2018: 45 tours, Vol.1, Single (credited as LGS)

Songs
2009: "La goutte" (credited as Swing)
2013: "Face à face" (credited as Swing)
2014: "C Okay" (credited as Swing)
2017: "A l'envers" (credited as LGS)
2019: "Thirsty" (credited as LGS)
2019: "C come ça (Fa la la)" (credited as LGS)

References
 Vachet, Benjamin. "Le nouveau projet de Michel Bénac." L'Express Ottawa - Culture 21 dec 2011, n. pag. Web. 5 Mar. 2013. <http://www.expressottawa.ca/Culture/2011-12-21/article-2844195/Le-nouveau-projet-de-Michel-Benac/1>. (Article)

External links
LGS official website

Musical groups with year of establishment missing
Canadian folk music groups
Canadian dance music groups
Franco-Ontarian musical groups
Musical groups established in 1998
1998 establishments in Ontario